The Blue Bloods was a heel professional wrestling stable in World Championship Wrestling (WCW) that consisted of "Lord" Steven Regal, "Earl" Robert Eaton, and "Squire" David Taylor, along with their butler Jeeves, who operated in the middle to late 1990s.

History

World Championship Wrestling (1995–2000)
The Blue Bloods were formed in 1995 in WCW by Regal after he split with his manager, Sir William, and became a tag team wrestler. Originally, Regal scouted Jean-Paul Levesque, and they were slated to be a tag team before Levesque left to join the World Wrestling Federation (WWF). Eventually, Regal recruited Alabama-born Bobby Eaton, getting him (kayfabe) "knighted" and renaming him "Earl Robert Eaton". Regal took it upon himself to teach Eaton the finer points of the British lifestyle, including the Queen's English and proper dining etiquette.

The team feuded with Harlem Heat (Booker T and Stevie Ray) and the team of Bunkhouse Buck and Dick Slater over the WCW World Tag Team Championship, but never got their hands on the titles. Later they were joined by "Squire" David Taylor and a butler named Jeeves, whom they openly abused. Eaton eventually left the group, leaving Taylor and Regal to feud with him.

Taylor and Regal continued to team together until Regal was released from WCW in February 1998 and went to the WWF, as at which point Taylor went on to compete in the singles division.

When Regal returned to WCW in July 1999, Regal and Taylor would reform the Blue Bloods in August. They would compete primarily on WCW Saturday Night, until the team disappeared from television in January 2000.

World Wrestling Entertainment (2006–2007)
In 2006, Regal (with his ring name changed to William) and Taylor reunited as a tag team on the SmackDown brand of World Wrestling Entertainment, however they used no parts of their previous "Blue Bloods" gimmick, instead becoming sadistic fighters, willing to go to just about any lengths for a win.

Championships and accomplishments
World Championship Wrestling
WCW World Television Championship (4 times) – Regal

References

World Championship Wrestling teams and stables
WWE teams and stables